Lee Reginald Tarlamis  (born 10 July 1975) is an Australian politician who has represented the South Eastern Metropolitan Region for the Labor Party in the Victorian Legislative Council since 2020. He previously served from 2010 to 2014.

Tarlamis resides in Melbourne and is of Greek descent. His roots can be traced to the Greek island of Lemnos.

Following his defeat at the 2014 Victorian state election, he was appointed as a political adviser for the Andrews Ministry. In 2020 he returned to the Legislative Council, filling a vacancy caused by Gavin Jennings's resignation.

References

1975 births
Living people
Australian people of Greek descent
Australian Labor Party members of the Parliament of Victoria
Members of the Victorian Legislative Council
Members of the Victorian Legislative Council for South Eastern Metropolitan Region
21st-century Australian politicians
Recipients of the Medal of the Order of Australia
People from Malvern, Victoria
Politicians from Melbourne